Superposition Benchmark is benchmarking software based on the UNIGINE Engine. The benchmark was developed and published by UNIGINE Company in 2017. The main purpose of software is performance and stability testing for GPUs. Users can choose a workload preset, Low to Extreme, or set the parameters by custom. The benchmark 3D scene is an office of a fictional genius scientist from the middle of the 20th century. The scene is GPU-intensive because of SSRTGI (Screen-Space Ray-Traced Global Illumination), proprietary dynamic lighting technology by Unigine.

Superposition and other benchmarks by Unigine are often used by hardware reviewers to measure graphics performance (PCMag, Digital Trends, Lifewire and others) and by overclockers for online and offline competitions in GPU overclocking. Running Superposition (or another) benchmark by Unigine produces a performance score: the higher the numbers, the better the performance. Users can compare different configurations in the online leaderboards.

Technological features 

 Visuals powered by UNIGINE 2 Engine
 Support for Windows 7 SP1 x64, Windows 8 x64, Windows 10 x64, Linux x64, macOS
 Extreme hardware stability testing
 GPU temperature and clock monitoring
 Unique SSRTGI (Screen-Space Ray-Traced Global Illumination) dynamic lighting technology
 VR experience (Oculus Rift and HTC Vive)
 Free exploration mode with mini-games
 Over 900 interactive objects
 Global leaderboards integration

See also 

 Benchmark
 Overclocking

References 

Benchmarks (computing)